is a Japanese former breaststroke swimmer. She competed in three events at the 1976 Summer Olympics.

References

External links
 

1959 births
Living people
Japanese female breaststroke swimmers
Olympic swimmers of Japan
Swimmers at the 1976 Summer Olympics
Place of birth missing (living people)
Asian Games medalists in swimming
Asian Games gold medalists for Japan
Swimmers at the 1974 Asian Games
Medalists at the 1974 Asian Games
20th-century Japanese women